The Magic Flute is a 2022 German musical fantasy film directed by Florian Sigl and written by Andrew Lowery, based on the 1791 opera of the same name by Wolfgang Amadeus Mozart.

Cast

Production

Development 
In 2017, Roland Emmerich's Centropolis Entertainment and Flimmer began to co-produce a modern-day adaptation of Mozart's opera, the brainchild of Florian Sigl and Christopher Zwickler. Emmerich and Zwickler produced, Sigl directed, while Andrew Lowery wrote the screenplay. Dan Maag and Fabian Wolfart of Pantaleon Films joined as producers at the 68th Berlin International Film Festival in February 2018.

Pixomondo created the film's VFX. The project received funds from both Austria and Germany.

Co-producers include Tim Oberwelland, Theodor Gringel, Peter Eiff and Tobias Alexander Seiffert of Tobis Film as well as Stefan Konarske of Quinta Media.

Casting 
The cast was announced in February 2021, with Iwan Rheon, Jack Wolfe, Asha Banks and Amir Wilson starring. Opera stars Sabine Devieilhe, Rolando Villazón and Morris Robinson would feature. Other cast members include F. Murray Abraham, Stéfi Celma, Jeanne Goursaud, Jasmin Shakeri, Lary, and Stefan Konarske.

Filming 
Principal photography began in February 2021 at Bavaria Studios in Munich and wrapped in Tenerife in April. Other reported filming locations included Salzburg and London.

Music 
Seventeen arias from The Magic Flute are featured in the film, performed by the individual actors.
 "Have Mercy"
 "Observe His Face"
 "I'm Sure That There Could Never Be"
 "Such Loveliness"
 "You, You, You"
 "Hm, Hm, Hm"
 "You Will Not Dare"
 "What Place Is This?"
 "A Man in Search"
 "Two Little Birds"
 "This Music"
 "Long Live to Sarastro"
 "All the World Is Always Lasting"
 "The Wrath of Hell"
 "Before Our Holy Altar"
 "Now I Know"
 "Pa Pa Papagena"

Three non opera songs are also included.
 "I'll Be There" (Jackson 5): The original track is heard early in the film, then is played on piano and sung by Tim and Sophie.
 "Time to Say Goodbye": Tim performs this as part of his introduction to the school.
 "Outweigh Your Love": Performed during the end credits by Madeleine and Wankelmut.

Release 
Sola Media has the rights to international distribution. First look stills were revealed in October 2021. The film premiered at the 2022 Zurich Film Festival. It received a theatrical release on 10 March 2023 through Shout! Studios.

Reception
The film received mixed reviews. Review aggregator website Rotten Tomatoes reports a 57% score, based on 14 reviews, with an average rating of 6/10.

References

External links 

"The Magic Flute (2022), 

2022 films
2020s musical films
German teen films
English-language films
German-language films
Italian-language films
Films based on The Magic Flute
Films set in Austria
Films set in London
Films shot at Bavaria Studios
Films shot in Austria
Films shot in London
Films shot in the Canary Islands
Opera films
German musical fantasy films
German romantic musical films
Teen musical films
Centropolis Entertainment films